Sandra Howard, Lady Howard of Lympne (born August 1940) is an English novelist, former model and the wife of Michael Howard, a former leader of the Conservative Party.

Life
She was trained at the Lucy Clayton Modelling Agency and as Sandra Paul, she was a well-known model in the 1960s and was featured on the cover of American Vogue for two months in a row, was photographed by David Bailey and Norman Parkinson and was acquainted with John F Kennedy, Frank Sinatra and Bob Dylan.

She has been married four times, the first of which was when she was 18 to jazz pianist Robin Douglas-Home, the nephew of the former Prime Minister, Alec Douglas-Home. She has a son, Sholto, from this marriage. She was later married to David Wynne-Morgan, a publicist, whom she also divorced. She then married advertising executive Nigel Grandfield.

It was while married to Grandfield that she met Michael Howard at a Red Cross Ball. She and Howard subsequently married in 1975. They have a son and a daughter.

She has written five novels, the most recent, Tell the Girl, was published on 3 July 2014. She made a brief foray back to her modelling career in the 1990s by posing for Marks & Spencer catalogues.

Publications
 Glass houses, Simon & Schuster, 2006. 
 Ursula's Story, Simon & Schuster, 2008. 
 Ex-wives, Simon & Schuster, 2010. 
 A Matter of Loyalty, Simon & Schuster, 2012. 
 Tell the Girl, Simon & Schuster, 2014.

References

External links
 
 CV
 BBC biography

1940 births
Living people
English female models
Howard of Lympne
Spouses of life peers
People educated at Croydon High School
English women novelists
20th-century English novelists
21st-century English novelists
20th-century English women writers
21st-century English women writers